Ningxia (alternately romanized as Ninghsia), officially the Ningxia Hui Autonomous Region (NHAR), is an autonomous region in the northwest of the People's Republic of China. Formerly a province, Ningxia was incorporated into Gansu in 1954 but was later separated from Gansu in 1958 and reconstituted as an autonomous region for the Hui people, one of the 56 officially recognised nationalities of China. Twenty percent of China's Hui population lives in Ningxia.

This sparsely settled, mostly desert region lies partially on the Loess Plateau and in the vast plain of the Yellow River and features the Great Wall of China along its northeastern boundary. Over about 2000 years an extensive system of canals (The total length about 1397 kilometers) has been built from Qin dynasty. Extensive land reclamation and irrigation projects have made increased cultivation possible. The arid region of Xihaigu, which covers large parts of the province, suffers from severe water shortage, which the canals were intended to alleviate.

Ningxia was the core area of the Western Xia in the 11th-13th century, established by the Tangut people; its name, "Peaceful Xia", derived from the Mongol conquest of the state. The Tanguts made significant achievements in literature, art, music, and architecture, particularly invented Tangut script. Long one of the country's poorest areas, a small winemaking industry has become economically important since the 1980s. Before the arrival of viticulture, Ningxia's 6.8 million people, 36 per cent of whom are Muslims from the Hui ethnic group, relied largely on animal grazing, subsistence agriculture and the cultivation of wolfberries used in traditional Chinese medicine. Since then, winemaking has become the premier specialty of Ningxia. The province housed almost 40,000 hectares of wine grapes and produced 120 million wine bottles in 2017 – a quarter of the entire nation's production.

History

As a frontier zone between nomadic pastoralists and sedentary farmers, Ningxia was a frequent seat of war and incursions by non-Chinese tribes. Ningxia and its surrounding areas were incorporated into the Qin as the Beidi Commandery as early as the 3rd century BC. To pacify the region, the imperial government established military colonies to reclaim land. In addition, horse pasturages were founded under the Imperial Stud to safeguard the supply of army horses, as early as the Western Han dynasty (206 BCE – 9 CE). Throughout the Han dynasty and the Tang dynasty there were several large cities established in the region. The Liang Province rebellion at the end of the Han Dynasty affected Ningxia.

By the 11th century the Tangut people had established the Western Xia dynasty on the outskirts of the then-Song dynasty. Jews also lived in Ningxia, as evidenced by the fact that in 1489, after a major flood destroyed Torah scrolls in Kaifeng, a replacement was sent to the Kaifeng Jews by the Ningbo and Ningxia Jewish communities.

It then came under Mongol domination after Genghis Khan conquered Yinchuan in the early 13th century. Muslims from Central Asia also began moving into Ningxia from the west. By the late 17th century, Ningxia had become a weaving center, producing many early Chinese carpets. The Muslim Dungan Revolt of the 19th century affected Ningxia.

In 1914, Ningxia was merged with the province of Gansu. However, in 1928 it was detached from Gansu and became a separate province. Between 1914 and 1928, the Ma clique ruled the provinces of Qinghai, Ningxia and Gansu; General Ma Hongkui was the military governor of Ningxia and had absolute authority in the province. The Muslim conflict in Gansu, which lasted from 1927 to 1930, spilled over into Ningxia. In 1934, warlord and National Revolutionary Army general Sun Dianying attempted to conquer the province, but was defeated by an alliance led by the Ma clique.

From 1950 to 1958, a Kuomintang Islamic insurgency resulted in fighting throughout Northwest China, including Ningxia. In 1954, the Chinese government merged Ningxia with Gansu, but in 1958 Ningxia formally became an autonomous region of China. In 1969, Ningxia received a part of the Inner Mongolian Autonomous Region, but this area was returned in 1979.

A number of Chinese artifacts dating from the Tang dynasty and Song dynasty, some of which had been owned by Emperor Zhenzong, were excavated and then came into the hands of Ma Hongkui, who refused to publicize the findings. Among the artifacts were a white marble tablet from the Tang dynasty, gold nails, and bands made out of metal. It was not until after Ma died that his wife went to Taiwan in 1971 from America to bring the artifacts to Chiang Kai-shek, who turned them over to the Taipei National Palace Museum.

Geography

Present-day Ningxia is one of the nation's smallest provincial-level units and borders the provinces of Shaanxi and Gansu and the Inner Mongolia Autonomous Region. At 3556 meters above sea level, Aobaogeda in the Helan Mountains is the highest point in Ningxia.

Ningxia is a relatively dry, desert-like region and features a diverse geography of forested mountains and hills, table lands, deserts, flood plains and basins cut through by the Yellow River. The Ningxia ecosystem is one of the least studied regions in the world. Significant irrigation supports the growing of wolfberries, a commonly consumed fruit throughout the region. Ningxia's deserts include the Tengger desert in Shapotou.

The northern section, through which the Yellow River flows, supports the best agricultural land. A railroad, linking Lanzhou with Baotou, crosses the region. A highway has been built across the Yellow River at Yinchuan.

Over 600 large loess landslides created more than 40 new lakes.

In 2006, satellite images indicated that a 700 by 200-meter fenced area within Ningxia— southwest of Yinchuan, near the remote village of Huangyangtan—is a near-exact 1:500 scale terrain model reproduction of a 450 by 350-kilometer area of Aksai Chin bordering India, complete with mountains, valleys, lakes and hills. Its purpose is as yet unknown.

Grasslands
It was reported that approximately 34 percent (33.85 million mu) of the region's total surface consisted of grassland. This figure is down from approximately 40 percent in the 1990s. The grasslands are spread over the dry desert-steppe area in the northeast (which forms a part of the Inner Mongolian steppe region), and the hilly pastures located on the semi-arid Loess Plateau in the south. It is ascertained that the grasslands of Ningxia have been degraded to various degrees. However, there is scientific debate as to what extent this degradation is taking place as measured in time and space. Historical research has also found limited evidence of expanding grassland degradation and desertification in Ningxia. A major component of land management in Ningxia is a ban on open grazing, which has been in place since 2003. The ecological and socio-economic effects of this Grazing Ban in relation to the grasslands and pastoralists' livelihood are contested. The ban stipulates that animal husbandry be limited to enclosed pens and no open grazing be permitted in certain time periods set by the Autonomous Region's People's Government.

Climate

The diurnal temperature variation can reach above , especially in spring.

Mineral resources
Ningxia is rich in mineral resources with proven deposits of 34 kinds of minerals, much
of which located in grassland areas. In 2011 it was estimated that the potential value per capita of these resources accounted for 163.5 percent of the nation's average. Ningxia boasts verified coal reserves of over 30 billion tons, with an estimated reserve of more than 202 billion tons, ranking sixth nationwide. Coal deposits are spread over one-third of the total surface of Ningxia, and mined in four major fields in the Helan and Xiangshan mountains, Ningdong and Yuanzhou (or Guyuan). The region's reserves of oil and natural gas can be found in Yanchi and Lingwu County, and are ideal for large-scale development of oil, natural gas and chemical industries. Ningxia leads China in gypsum deposits, with a proven reserve of more than 4.5 billion tons, of which the rarely found, top-grade gypsum accounts for half of the total deposits. The Hejiakouzi deposit in Tongxin County features a reserve of 20 million tons of gypsum with a total thickness of 100 meters. There is a considerable deposit of quartz sandstone, of which 17 million tons have been ascertained. In addition, there are phosphorus, flint, copper, iron, barite, other minerals and Helan stone – a special clay stone.

Governance 

The politics of Ningxia is structured in a dual party-government system like all other governing institutions in mainland China.

The Chairman of the Autonomous Region is the highest-ranking official in the People's Government of Ningxia. However, in the Autonomous Region's dual party-government governing system, the Chairman has less power than the Chinese Communist Party (CCP) Ningxia Committee Secretary, colloquially termed the "Ningxia CCP Party Chief".

Ningxia has a friendship agreement with Sogn og Fjordane county of Norway.

Administrative divisions 

Ningxia is divided into five prefecture-level divisions: all prefecture-level cities:

The five prefecture-level cities of Ningxia are subdivided into 22 county-level divisions (9 districts, 2 county-level cities, and 11 counties).

Urban areas

Economy 

 Rural Ningxia was for long an officially designated poverty area, and is still located on the lower rungs of the developmental ladder. It is the province with the third smallest GDP (Tibet being the last) in China, even though its neighbors, Inner Mongolia and Shaanxi, are among the strongest emerging provincial economies in the country. Its nominal GDP in 2011 was just 200.0 billion yuan (US$32.7 billion) and a per capita GDP of 21,470 yuan (US$3,143). It contributes 0.44% of the national economy.

Agriculture
Similar to other areas, Ningxia has seen a gradual decline of its peasant population due to rural–urban migration. In spite of this, the great majority (62.8 percent) was still agricultural at the time of the survey. Animal husbandry is important for the regional economy. In the main pastoral county, Yanchi, it is even the leading industry when specified for the primary sector. The dominant grazing animals are sheep and goat. In the (semi-)pastoral regions, herders engage in a mixed sedentary farming operation of dryland agriculture and extensive animal husbandry, while full nomadic pastoralism is no longer practiced.

Ningxia is the principal region of China where wolfberries are grown. Other specialties of Ningxia are licorice, products made from Helan stone, fiddlehead and products made from sheepskin.

Ningxia wines are a promising area of development. The Chinese authorities have given approval to the development of the eastern base of the Helan Mountains as an area suitable for wine production. Several large Chinese wine companies including Changyu and Dynasty Wine have begun development in the western region of the province. Together they now own 20,000 acres of land for wine plantations and Dynasty has ploughed 100 million yuan into Ningxia. In addition, the major oil company China Petroleum and Chemical Corporation has founded a grape plantation near the Helan Mountains. The household appliance company Midea has also begun participating in Ningxia's wine industry. Vineyards have been set up in the region.

Industries and economic zones

Yinchuan Economic and Technological Development Zone was established in 1992. Spanning , it has an annual economic output Rmb23.7 billion (25.1% up) (US$3.5 billion). Major investors are mainly local enterprises such as Kocel Steel Foundry, FAG Railway Bearing (Ningxia), Ningxia Little Giant Machine Tools, etc. Major industries include machinery and equipment manufacturing, new materials, fine chemicals and the animation industry.

Desheng Industrial Park (in Helan County) is a base for about 400 enterprises. The industrial park has industrial chains from Muslim food and commodities to trade and logistics, new materials and bio-pharmaceuticals that has 80 billion yuan in fixed assets. Desheng is looking to be the most promising industrial park in the city. It achieved a total output value of 4.85 billion in 2008, up 40 percent year-on-year. The local government plans to cut taxes and other fees to reduce the burden on local enterprises. The industrial output value reached 2.68 billion yuan in 2008, an increase of 48 percent from a year earlier.

Transport

Airports
 Yinchuan Hedong International Airport
 Zhongwei Shapotou Airport
 Guyuan Liupanshan Airport
 Wuhai Airport (serves the northern area)

Highways
 China National Highway 109
 China National Highway 110
 China National Highway 211
 China National Highway 307
 China National Highway 309
 China National Highway 312

Bridge
 Taole Yellow River Expressway Bridge

Rail
 Baotou–Lanzhou railway
 Baoji–Zhongwei railway

Education

Demographics

Religion 

Islam is the single biggest religious tradition in Ningxia, adhered to by 34% of the population according to a 2010 survey. Many of the Han Chinese practice Chinese folk religions, Taoism, Confucianism and Chinese Buddhism. Christianity was the religion of 1.17% of the province's population according to the Chinese General Social Survey of 2004.

In 2008, the number of mosques in Ningxia was 3,760, which is about one per 1730 residents.

Hospitals 
 People's Hospital of Ningxia
 Hospital of Traditional Chinese Medicine of Ningxia
 Ningxia Medical College Affiliated Hospital
 Yinchuan Hospital of Traditional Chinese Medicine
 Yinchuan People's Hospital
 Yinchuan Stomatological Hospital
 Yinchuan Women and Children's Healthcare Center
 Women and Children's Healthcare Center of Ningixa
 Yinchuan No.1 People's Hospital
 Yinchuan No.2 People's Hospital
 Yinchuan No.3 People's Hospital
 Shizuishan No.2 People's Hospital
 Guyuan Hospital of Ningxia

Tourism 

The remnants of nine Western Xia emperors' tombs and two hundred other tombs lie within a  area. Other famous sites in Ningxia include the Helan Mountains, the mysterious 108 stupas, the twin pagodas of Baisikou and the desert research outpost at Shapatou. A less visited tourist spot in Ningxia is the Mount Sumeru Grottoes, which is among the ten most famous grottoes in China.

Museums 
 Ningxia Museum, opened in 1988
 Ningxia Transportation Museum, opened in August 2008
 Museum of Contemporary Art Yinchuan (MOCA Yinchuan), opened on 8 August 2015.

Notable people 
 Emma Gao, winemaker
 Zhang Jin, physical chemist and nanotechnologist

See also 

 Major national historical and cultural sites in Ningxia

References

Citations

Sources

External links

 Ningxia Provincial Government 
 
 Economic profile for Ningxia at HKTDC
 Ningxia Profile - UNESCAP 
 Ningxia Profile - China Economic Information Network

 
Autonomous regions of China
Western China
States and territories established in 1958